Monica Azuba Ntege (née Monica Azuba) is a Ugandan engineer and politician. She was the Minister of Works and Transport in the Ugandan Cabinet. She was appointed to that position on 6 June 2016 replacing John Byabagambi, who became Minister for Karamoja. She was replaced by Katumba Wamala in the cabinet on 14 December 2019.

Background and education
Monica Azuba was born in the Busoga sub-region, in the Eastern Region of Uganda, about 1954. She attended Gayaza High School for her O-Level and A-Level studies, graduating in 1973. She entered Makerere University in 1974, graduating in 1978 with a Bachelor of Science in Civil Engineering.

Career
She was employed by Uganda Commercial Bank after graduating from Makerere in 1978. 
When it was purchased by Standard Bank of South Africa in 2002, she stayed with he institution, rising to the position of Facilities Manager at Stanbic Bank Uganda Limited. She has served as a member of the board of Uganda National Roads Authority since June 2014. On 6 June 2016, she was appointed Minister of Works and Transport.

Work as Minister of Works and Transport
One of the first tasks that she was handed, soon after taking the oath as the works and transport minister, was to evaluate how the government of Uganda is going to revive the defunct Uganda Airlines. The national airline was liquidated in 2001, because it was deemed "unprofitable".

However, in 2013, a decision was made to revive the airline, in order to increase the number of tourists visiting Uganda and to cater for increased human and cargo traffic to the country as Uganda's nascent petrochemical industry grows. The major stakeholders under the chairmanship of the minister, including representatives from the Ministry of Works and Transport, the Uganda Development Corporation, the Civil Aviation Authority of Uganda, the Ministry of Trade, Industry and Cooperatives,  the Ministry of Finance, Planning and Economic Development and others met and made recommendations. These were forwarded to cabinet for final approval before implementation.

Personal life
Ntege is married. She is a champion golfer and has won several tournaments nationally and regionally. In the past, she has served as a regional trustee of the All Africa Challenge Trophy in ladies golf.

See also
 Cabinet of Uganda
 Parliament of Uganda
 James Zikusoka

References

1950s births
Living people
Year of birth uncertain
Ugandan civil engineers
Members of the Parliament of Uganda
Government ministers of Uganda
People from Eastern Region, Uganda
Makerere University alumni
Ugandan women engineers
21st-century Ugandan women politicians
21st-century Ugandan politicians
People educated at Gayaza High School
Women government ministers of Uganda
Women members of the Parliament of Uganda
21st-century women engineers
21st-century Ugandan women scientists
21st-century Ugandan scientists
Public works ministers of Uganda
Transport ministers of Uganda